René Deddens (born 28 June 1992) is a German motorcycle speedway rider who is a member of the German junior national team.

Career details

World Championships 

 Individual U-21 World Championship
 2009 - 11th place in the Qualifying Round 1
 2010 - 12th place in the Qualifying Round 1

European Championships 

 Individual U-19 European Championship
 2009 -  Tarnów - 17th place (0 pts) as track reserve
 2010 - withdrew in the Semi-Final One
 Team U-19 European Championship
 2009 - 3rd place in the Semi-Final
 2010 - 3rd place in the Semi-Final

See also 
 Germany national speedway team

References 

German speedway riders
1992 births
Living people